Dale Mulholland (born August 16, 1964) is an American former soccer player who became a coach. As a player, he spent time in West Germany, the Soviet Union, Czechoslovakia and his native United States. His most notable achievement as a player was signing for Lokomotiv Moscow in 1990. As a coach he was worked in Thailand, Indonesia and the United States.

Early life
Mulholland was born in Tacoma, Washington, in 1964. He attended University of Puget Sound and Warner Pacific College, where he majored in philosophy.

Playing career
In 1990, he was traded by the Orlando Lions in the American Professional Soccer League to Lokomotiv Moscow in the Soviet First League for Aleksandr Golovnya. He signed a one-year contract, becoming the first American to play in the USSR. Mulholland scored once in Moscow, a penalty in a match against FC Kuzbass Kemerovo in Locomotiv's last match of the 1990 Soviet First League.

In 1991, he returned to the United States, playing with Miami Freedom of the American Professional Soccer League (APSL) during the summer of 1991 for the short American outdoor season.

Mulholland made seven league appearances for Dukla Prague during the second half of the 1991–92 Czechoslovak First League season.

Coaching career

Served as the Director of Coaching / Head Coach for the Arsenal Soccer Schools franchise for Indonesia, participating in the local men's league with the Jakarta Vikings and formerly playing and managing with the local men's club, 6 times local champions, the Wanderers FC in the JIFL (Jakarta International Football League).

References

External links
American Professional Soccer League 1992 Season
American Professional Soccer League 1991 Season

1964 births
Living people
American soccer players
American expatriate soccer players
American Soccer League (1988–89) players
American Professional Soccer League players
Miami Freedom players
Orlando Lions players
FC Lokomotiv Moscow players
Dukla Prague footballers
Soviet First League players
Czechoslovak First League players
Expatriate footballers in the Soviet Union
Expatriate footballers in Czechoslovakia
Soccer players from Tacoma, Washington
Association football forwards
American expatriate sportspeople in West Germany
American expatriate sportspeople in Czechoslovakia
American expatriate sportspeople in the Soviet Union
American expatriate sportspeople in Indonesia
Expatriate football managers in Indonesia
Expatriate footballers in West Germany